{{DISPLAYTITLE:C20H15NO4}}
The molecular formula C20H15NO4 (molar mass: 333.34 g/mol, exact mass: 333.1001 u) may refer to:

 Bisoxatin
 Dihydrosanguinarine